Mollinedia gilgiana is a species of plant in the Monimiaceae family. The plant is endemic to the Atlantic Forest ecoregion in southeastern Brazil. It is a Critically endangered species, threatened by habitat loss.

References

gilgiana
Endemic flora of Brazil
Flora of the Atlantic Forest
Flora of Rio de Janeiro (state)
Critically endangered flora of South America
Taxonomy articles created by Polbot